Papaipema rutila, the mayapple borer moth, is a species of cutworm or dart moth in the family Noctuidae. It is found in North America.

The MONA or Hodges number for P. rutila is 9484.

References

Further reading

External links

 

Papaipema
Articles created by Qbugbot
Moths described in 1852